Moss Lake is a small lake in Delta County, Michigan.

See also
List of lakes in Michigan

References

Lakes of Michigan
Lakes of Delta County, Michigan